James Alexander Squires (born 15 November 1975 in Preston) is an English footballer.

References

External links

1975 births
Living people
Footballers from Preston, Lancashire
English footballers
Preston North End F.C. players
Mansfield Town F.C. players
Dunfermline Athletic F.C. players
Carlisle United F.C. players
Doncaster Rovers F.C. players
Nuneaton Borough F.C. players
Bamber Bridge F.C. players
Chorley F.C. players
Scottish Football League players
Scottish Premier League players
Association football defenders